Julija Portjanko (born Yuliya Ihorivna Portyanko, ; 20 April 1983 – 12 October 2021), also known as Julija Nikolić, was a Macedonian handball player. She last played for the club ŽRK Vardar and for the Macedonia national team. She represented Macedonia at the 2008 European Women's Handball Championship, where Macedonia finished 7th, and Portjanko was among the top-ten goalscorers at the championship.

On 3 June 2012, after leading Macedonia to qualification for the 2012 European Women's Handball Championship she announced her retirement from the national team.

References

External links
 

1983 births
2021 deaths
Macedonian female handball players
Macedonian people of Ukrainian descent
Ukrainian emigrants to North Macedonia
Sportspeople from Dnipro